Hutberg is a mountain of Saxony, southeastern Germany near Oderwitz.

References 

Mountains of Saxony
Lusatian Highlands